UNITED24 Media is a Ukrainian English-language digital media created by the Ministry of Digital Transformation of Ukraine during the 2022 Russian invasion of Ukraine.

History 

United24 Media was launched on July 21, 2022, on the Instagram social network. The pilot issue was devoted to the importance of drones in the Russo-Ukrainian war. The project is managed by the Ministry of Digital Transformation of Ukraine. The concept was created free of charge by Fedoriv Marketing & Innovations Agency as a strategic partner of the project.

Description 

It is an English-language digital media in a modern format, centered around a YouTube channel and social media platforms. United24 Media works on individual episodes and covers six themes: culture, history, people, technology, business and war. Key audiences correspond to the list of countries that most support Ukraine during the war and show great interest in Ukraine. These are the United States, the United Kingdom, the European Union and Canada. However, United24 Media's content is designed to reach a broad audience that actively uses social media, YouTube and other interactive formats.

See also 
United24

References

External links 
 

Mass media in Kyiv
Ukrainian news websites
2022 Russian invasion of Ukraine
2022 establishments in Ukraine